Chat Qeshlaq-e Bala (also Romanized as Chāt Qeshlāq-e Bālā; also known as Chād Qeshlāq and Chāt Qeshlāq) is a village in Angut-e Sharqi Rural District, Anguti District, Germi County, Ardabil Province, Iran. At the 2006 census, its population was 97, in 18 families.

References 

Towns and villages in Germi County